Catherine S. Enz (born March 16, 1954) is a former American Republican politician who served in the Missouri House of Representatives.

Born in St. Louis, Missouri, she graduated from McCluer High School in 1972.  In 2002, she ran against U.S. House Minority Leader Dick Gephardt in Missouri's 3rd congressional district.

References

20th-century American politicians
21st-century American politicians
20th-century American women politicians
21st-century American women politicians
Republican Party members of the Missouri House of Representatives
Living people
Women state legislators in Missouri
1954 births